Thomas W. Hayes was the 28th California State Treasurer.  A Republican, he was nominated by Governor George Deukmejian to fill the vacancy created by the August 4, 1987 death of Democrat Jesse M. Unruh.  He took office in 1989, upon confirmation by both houses of the California Legislature.  He was Governor Deukmejian's second nominee; the first, Congressman Dan Lungren, had been refused confirmation by the State Senate. In 1990, he won the Republican nomination for election to a term as state treasurer in his own right, defeating former Treasurer of the United States Angela "Bay" Buchanan (sister of Patrick J. Buchanan), but was defeated in the general election by Democrat Kathleen Brown.

Prior to his service as state treasurer, he had served as Auditor General of the State of California from 1979 to 1989.  After leaving office as state treasurer in January 1991, he joined the administration of newly elected Governor Pete Wilson as its director of finance, serving from 1991 to 1993. Since then, he has worked in the private sector, with occasional forays into public service, most notably assisting Orange County with its finances after its notorious 1994 bankruptcy triggered by derivatives investments gone awry.

References

See also 
Oral History Interview with Thomas W. Hayes (1995). California State Archives.

State treasurers of California
Year of birth missing (living people)
Living people
California Republicans